Imran Khalid (born 29 December 1982) is a Pakistani first-class cricketer who played for Faisalabad.

References

External links
 

1982 births
Living people
Pakistani cricketers
Faisalabad cricketers
Faisalabad Wolves cricketers
Islamabad United cricketers
Peshawar cricketers
People from Kasur District